Isolabella or Isola Bella may refer to:

Places

Italy
 Isolabella, Turin, an Italian municipality in the Metropolitan City of Turin, Piedmont
 Isolabella, Cisterna di Latina, a village in the town of Cisterna di Latina, Province of Latina, Lazio
 Isola Bella (Lago Maggiore), one of the Borromean islands of Lago Maggiore, near Stresa
 Isola Bella (Sicily), island off the east coast of Sicily, near Taormina

United States
 Isola Bella, popular name for the James Johnston House in Brentwood, Tennessee

Other 
 Isola Bella (film), a 1961 West German film